Douglas P. "Doug" Lindskog (born August 12, 1955) is a Canadian retired professional ice hockey player who played two games in the World Hockey Association with the Calgary Cowboys during the 1976–77 WHA season.

External links

References

1955 births
Living people
Calgary Cowboys draft picks
Calgary Cowboys players
Ice hockey people from Alberta
Michigan Wolverines men's ice hockey players
St. Louis Blues draft picks
San Diego Mariners (PHL) players
Sportspeople from Red Deer, Alberta
Tidewater Sharks players
Canadian ice hockey left wingers